Great Canadian Railway Journeys is a BBC travel documentary series presented by Michael Portillo and aired on BBC Two. Using an 1899 copy of Appleton's Guidebook to the railways of the United States and Canada, Portillo explores historic Canadian railways and learns about the places along the way.

Episodes

Series 1 (2019)

Halifax to La Malbaie

Vancouver to Calgary

Winnipeg to Jasper

References

External links
 

2019 British television series debuts
2019 British television series endings
2010s British documentary television series
2010s British travel television series
BBC television documentaries
BBC travel television series
Documentary television series about railway transport
English-language television shows
Television shows set in Canada
Television series by Fremantle (company)